The 2018–19 Carolina Hurricanes season was the 40th season for the National Hockey League (NHL) franchise that was established on June 22, 1979 (following seven seasons of play in the World Hockey Association), and 21st season since the franchise relocated from Hartford to start the 1997–98 NHL season. For the first time since 2009, the Hurricanes reached the playoffs, clinching a playoff berth with a 3–1 win against the New Jersey Devils on April 4, 2019. In the playoffs the Hurricanes reached the Conference Finals where they were swept by the Boston Bruins.

Standings

Schedule and results

Preseason
The preseason schedule was published on June 12, 2018.

Regular season
The regular season schedule was released on June 21, 2018.

Detailed records
Updated as of April 6, 2019

Playoffs

The Hurricanes faced the Washington Capitals in the First Round of the playoffs, and defeated them in seven games.

The Hurricanes faced the New York Islanders in the Second Round of the playoffs, sweeping them in four games, which was the first best-of-seven series sweep in Hurricanes/Whalers franchise history.

The Hurricanes faced the Boston Bruins in the Conference Finals, and were swept in four games. They played against each other in the 2009 Stanley Cup playoffs, where the Hurricanes defeated the Bruins in the Conference Semifinals in seven games.

Player statistics
As of May 16, 2019

Skaters

Goaltenders

†Denotes player spent time with another team before joining the Hurricanes. Stats reflect time with the Hurricanes only.
‡Denotes player was traded mid-season. Stats reflect time with the Hurricanes only.
Bold/italics denotes franchise record.

Transactions
The Hurricanes have been involved in the following transactions during the 2018–19 season.

Trades

Free agents

Waivers

Contract terminations

Retirement

Signings

Draft picks

Below are the Carolina Hurricanes' selections at the 2018 NHL Entry Draft, which was held on June 22 and 23, 2018, at the American Airlines Center in Dallas, Texas.

Notes:
 The Arizona Coyotes' fourth-round pick went to the Carolina Hurricanes as the result of a trade on May 3, 2018, that sent Marcus Kruger and a third-round pick in 2018 to Arizona in exchange for Jordan Martinook and this pick.

References

Carolina Hurricanes seasons
Carolina Hurricanes
Carolina Hurricanes
Carolina Hurricanes